Dolnja Košana (in older sources Dolenja Košana) is a village west of Pivka in the Inner Carniola region of Slovenia.

The Košana parish church in the settlement is dedicated to Saint Stephen and belongs to the Koper Diocese.

Notable people
Notable people that were born or lived in Dolnja Košana include:
Franc Šturm (1881–1944), linguist, translator, and communist activist

References

External links

Dolnja Košana on Geopedia
Košana Local Community site

Populated places in the Municipality of Pivka